Stephen Van Egmond Irwin RAIC, RIBA, OAA, BArch, MArch (March 10, 1939 – March 5, 2019) was a Canadian architect and "partner emeritus" of Shore Tilbe Irwin + Partners in Toronto, Ontario.

Biography 
Irwin trained at the University of Toronto, where he was a member of the Alpha Delta Phi fraternity. He later studied at Harvard University, where he received MArch. In 1963 he received the British Prix de Rome in Architecture.

Irwin began his design career in 1962 in Sweden, for Gronwall-Hirsch, and worked for one year in London, England, for Hugh Casson, Conder & Partners. He returned to Canada in 1965, where he joined Shore & Moffat (now Shore Tilbe Irwin + Partners). He was a partner of the firm from 1971.

Irwin died on March 5, 2019.

Buildings
 Bioscience Complex, Queen's University, Kingston, Ontario
 Central Library, Mississauga, Ontario
 Xerox Research Centre, Mississauga, Ontario
 Toronto Police Headquarters
 Purdy's Wharf office complex, Halifax, Nova Scotia

References

External links
 Shore Tilbe Irwin and Partners

1939 births
2019 deaths
Harvard Graduate School of Design alumni
University of Toronto alumni
Canadian architects
Prix de Rome (Britain) winners